DNK Russia — is a Russian designer brand of family clothing and accessories production, founded by sisters Anna Alekseeva and Olga Kovalenko (both before marriages — Nichkova).

Activity 
In 2015, Anna Nichkova and Olga Nichkova began sewing baby clothes for their own newborn children according to their sketches. On summer of 2015, the first batch of children's clothing was sold using Instagram.

In 2016, a warehouse for clothes was opened. A year later, the sisters signed a contract with a sewing company, but the received batch turned out to be defective. This incident was the reason for the opening of there sewing workshop. In the fall of 2017, the official website of the company was launched.

In 2018, they attracted the attention of the public with a project when models, children, singers, artists, star children, people with disabilities came to the same podium at the Moscow Fashion Week show.

In 2020, as part of the #myplace campaign, 2 thousand hygienic masks were sewn for volunteers and the elderly people.

On October 3, filming of the Cinema Fashion project "Another Reality" took place, where a show of various clothing brands was presented, including DNK.

And also DNK is an eco—friendly brand. They abandoned polyethylene for packaging, replacing it with a convenient and practical alternative — a shopping bag. And they continue to develop new packaging for deliveries that will meet all environmental requirements

Name 
In 2015, when selling the first batch, the brand was named D&N Kids, since the Dom & Nica trademark was registered to Anna's husband. Later, the brand was renamed DNK Kids, then DNK Russia, as it is today.

Impressions 
 Moscow Fashion Week — SS2020, SS2019
 Fashion Week in Belarus — AW2018
 Crimean Fashion Week 2018
 Caspian Fashion Week 2018

Awards 
 2017 — Kids Fashion Awards in the category "Breakthrough of the Year"
 2019 — Kids Fashion Awards
 2020 — the Book of Records of Russia in the category "The largest number of children who demonstrated clothes of one brand on video in Russia".
 2020 — record holder Instagram 2020 in the nomination of the most successful "Russian top bloggers".
 2021 — the book of records of Russia in the category "The largest number of participants in the fashion show of one brand (online)"

Advertising campaigns 
 500 raincoats for the program "Heads and tails" on TV channel "Friday!"
 30 sets of the collection "Alice in Wonderland", "Hippie" with Simona Yunusova
 children's clothing together with Black Star and Anastasia Reshetova
 collection of sweatshirts with images of Soviet cartoon characters from Soyuzmultfilm and Smeshariki
 DNK&AlexSparrow By Alexey Vorobyov
 Instagram promotion by Marie Kraymbreri, Velvet Musiс and Natalia Zubareva
 merch for Love Radio

Products 
At launch, only children's clothing was created: overalls, "kids" and hats. By the end of 2015, children's T-shirts and hoodies were added. In 2017, the range includes children's tracksuits. In October 2017, a trial batch of dresses for daughters and mothers was released. Then clothes for the whole family began to be created. In 2021, the collection "DNK&SMESHARIKI" was created, which consists of T-shirts, sweatshirts, trousers, leggings and suits. The line is designed not only for children and teenagers, but also for adults.

Implementation 
 Stores
 Russia: Rostov-on-Don.
 Online platforms:
 Official website
 Wildberries
 Instagram

References

External links
 Instagram

Clothing brands of Russia